The Huronian glaciation (or Makganyene glaciation) was a period where several ice ages occurred during the deposition of the Huronian Supergroup, rather than a single continuous event as it is commonly misrepresented to be. The deposition of this group extended from 2.5 billion years ago (Gya) to 2.2 Gya, during the Siderian and Rhyacian periods of the Paleoproterozoic era. This led to the deposition of several diamictites. Most of the deposits of the Huronian are typical passive margin deposits in a marine setting. The diamictites within the Huronian are on par in thickness with Quaternary analogs. 

Evidence for the Huronian comes from glacial deposits identified within the stratigraphic record of the Huronian Supergroup. Within it are three distinct formations of diamictite, from the oldest to youngest, the Ramsay, Bruce, and Gowganda Formations. Although there are other glacial deposits recognized throughout the world, the Huronian is restricted to the North American Midwest. Other similar deposits are known from South Africa. The Huronian glaciation broadly coincides with the Great Oxygenation Event (GOE), a time when increased atmospheric oxygen decreased atmospheric methane. The oxygen combined with the methane to form carbon dioxide and water, reducing the efficacy of the greenhouse effect as water precipitated out of the air. The combination of increasing free oxygen and climatic stresses likely caused an extinction event, the first and longest lasting in the Earth's history.

Discovery and name 
In 1907, Arthur Philemon Coleman first inferred a "lower Huronian ice age" from analysis of a geological formation near Lake Huron in North America. This formation consists of two non-glacial sediment deposits found between three horizons of glacial deposits of the Huronian Supergroup, deposited between 2.5 and 2.2 Gya. Despite the name, the Huronian glaciation does not in fact represent a single glaciation. 

The confusion of the terms glaciation and ice age has led to the more recent impression that the entire time period represents a single glacial event. The term Huronian is used to describe a lithostratigraphic supergroup and should not be used to describe glacial cycles, according to The North American Stratigraphic Code, which defines the proper naming of geologic physical and chrono units. Diachronic or geochronometric units should be used.

Geology and climate

The Gowganda Formation (2.3 Gya) contains "the most widespread and most convincing glaciogenic deposits of this era", according to Eyles and Young. Similar deposits are found in Michigan (2.23–2.15 Gya), the Black Hills (2.6–1.6 Gya), Chibougamau, Canadian Northern Territories (2.1 Gya) and Wyoming. Similar age deposits occur in the Griquatown Basin (2.3 Gya), India (1.8 Gya) and Australia (2.5—2.0 Gya).

The tectonic setting was one of a rifting continental margin. New continental crust would have resulted in chemical weathering. This weathering would pull CO2 out of the atmosphere, cooling the planet through the reduction in greenhouse effect.

One or more of the glaciations may have been snowball earth events, when all or almost all of the earth was covered in ice.

Implications of the Huronian 

Before the Huronian Ice Age, most organisms were anaerobic, but around this time, cyanobacteria evolved oxygenic photosynthesis. These bacteria were able to rapidly dominate most environments utilizing this new ecological niche, exploiting the abundant energy of the sunlight. Photosynthesis produced oxygen as a waste product, which was expelled into the air. At first, most of this oxygen was absorbed through the oxidation of surface iron and the decomposition of life forms, however, as the population of cyanobacteria continued to grow, these oxygen sinks became saturated.

As oxygen "polluted" the atmosphere and began to oxidise methane, a mass extinction occurred of most life forms, which were anaerobic and to whom oxygen was toxic. Methane's fraction of the atmosphere was reduced to trace gas levels, as it reacted to form carbon dioxide and water. A different atmosphere emerged which was thinner, with less powerful greenhouse gases. Despite water's efficacy as a greenhouse gas, it readily precipitates out of the air. Earth's temperature dropped, partly because solar luminosity was lower at that time so the Earth was more vulnerable to a decline in greenhouse gases.

See also 
 Timeline of glaciation

References 

Paleoproterozoic geology
Precambrian geochronology
Glaciology
Ice ages
Extinction events
Proterozoic North America